Dehbid (also Romanized as Dehbīd and Deh Bīd) is a village in Kenareh Rural District, in the Central District of Marvdasht County, Fars Province, Iran. At the 2006 census, its population was 1,117, in 271 families.

References 

Populated places in Marvdasht County